Chad–Romania relations refers to bilateral relations between Chad and Romania. Diplomatic relations were established on 15 July 1969. Neither country has an embassy.

Agreements
An agreement on trade was signed in 1969, followed by an agreement on economic and technical cooperation in 1971, the volume of bilateral trade remained insignificant.

History
In November 2007, Romania announced that they would deploy 120 troops to Chad and the Central African Republic in connection with a European Union peacekeeping mission there. Romania continued to condemn violence in Chad and blamed it on rebel groups. However, by mid-2008, Romanian defence minister Teodor Meleșcanu indicated that his country would not send further troops to the mission in Chad, stating that they had reached their limits and did not want involvement in a war theatre.

In December 2008, Romanian national Marin Cioroianu was arrested in Harghita County, Romania in connection with the July 2007 murder of Brahim Déby, the son of Chadian president Idriss Déby, in a Paris parking garage. Déby's attackers had shot arrows at him, tackled him, and attacked him with fire extinguisher foam, leading to death by asphyxiation. DNA in a glove taken from Cioroianu's car matched DNA collected at the murder scene. However, due to Interpol's French office lacking funds to pay for his extradition to France, Cioroianu remained in custody in Romania.

Similarities of flags
The flags of Romania and Chad are nearly identical, the only difference being that Romania defines the colors used more narrowly than Chad, resulting in slight variations in shading. Chad began to use its present flag in 1960, after it achieved independence from France. At that time, the Chad and Romanian flags were distinguishable by the latter's inclusion of the Coat of Arms of the Socialist Republic of Romania at the Romanian flag's centre. However, in 1989, the coat of arms was removed entirely after the revolution which overthrew Nicolae Ceaușescu. Romania had used its older flag starting in 1866, based on a flag used since 1848 in its region Wallachia.  

In 2004, there were unconfirmed media reports that Chad had called on the United Nations to look into the issue, prompting then-Romanian president Ion Iliescu to make a public statement that his country would not give up the flag. BBC News quoted Iliescu as stating that "The tricolour belongs to us. We will not give up the tricolour."

See also
 Foreign relations of Chad 
 Foreign relations of Romania

References

External links
Statement about the flag issue from the Romanian Ministry of Foreign Affairs (in Romanian)

Romania
Bilateral relations of Romania